Pouya Idani (born 22 September 1995) is an Iranian chess player. He was awarded the title of Grandmaster (GM) by FIDE in 2014. He won the World U18 chess Championship in 2013. He is the 2nd best chess player in Iran (as of June 2021).

Chess career
Idani represented his country in a number of chess olympiads, including 2012 and 2014.

He played in the Chess World Cup 2015, where he was defeated in the first round by Shakhriyar Mamedyarov.

He is the champion of the 2018 Goa Open tournament.

In 2008, he won 2nd place at the 7th Dubai Juniors Chess Championship and at the 4th World Schools Chess Championships - Open U13 in Singapore.

In 2009, he won 2nd place at the Iranian U14 Championship, and tied in 5th place at the World U14 Championship with Mads Andersen.

Idani won the Iranian U18 championship in 2011.

He tied 3rd to 8th place at the World U18 Championship in 2012 with Jorge Cori, Jan-Krzysztof Duda, Gabor Nagy, Kacper Drozdowski, and Vladislav Kovalev.

He qualified again for the Chess World Cup 2021 where, ranked 85th, he defeated Ziaur Rahman 2–0 in the first round, David Antón Guijarro 1.5-0.5 in the second round, and 21st-seed Evgeny Tomashevsky 2.5-1.5 in the third round. He was eliminated in the fourth round by the eventual winner Jan-Krzysztof Duda.

His father, Mr. Esmaeil Idani, held official governmental positions in Iran that received several retractions on published papers that subsequently considered as an academic scandle.

References

External links 
 
 Pouya Idani chess games at 365Chess.com
 

1995 births
Living people
Chess grandmasters
Iranian chess players
People from Ahvaz